William Charles Shipway (2 September 1862 – 28 June 1925) was an Australian politician.

Born in Braidwood to Joshua Shipway and Mary Downey, he attended school in Yass and Sydney and was articled as a solicitor, being admitted in 1890. He had served in Sudan with the New South Wales Infantry Regiment in 1885. From 1894 to 1895 he was the Free Trade member for Paddington in the New South Wales Legislative Assembly. He married Mabel Adeline Bull on 15 September 1897 at Liverpool, with whom he had four children. Shipway died in Mosman in 1925.

References

 

1862 births
1925 deaths
Free Trade Party politicians
Members of the New South Wales Legislative Assembly
Australian solicitors
Australian Army soldiers